Trevor Davison (born 20 August 1992) is an English professional rugby union player who plays as a prop for Northampton Saints in the Premiership Rugby.

Club career
Davison joined Newcastle Falcons in the summer of 2017 from boyhood club Blaydon RFC, for whom he made over 100 appearances where he developed under Micky Ward. Making 23 first team appearances in his debut season, 13 of which came in the Premiership, Davison was part of the Falcons side which defeated Northampton Saints in front of a club record crowd of 30,174 at St James' Park. In 2018-19, he started in the Champions Cup home games against Edinburgh Rugby and Toulon. Helping the Falcons to promotion from the RFU Championship in 2019-20, Davison scored two tries in 17 appearances during the 2020-21 campaign.

Davidson left Newcastle Falcons on the 14th of March 2023 to Join Northampton Saints.

International career
Having represented England Counties on multiple overseas tours, Davison was included in the senior England squad by coach Eddie Jones in June 2021. On 4 July 2021 Davison made his Test debut off the bench in a victory over the United States at Twickenham. Later that year he won his second cap when he featured against Australia.

References

External links
Newcastle Falcons Profile
ESPN Profile
Ultimate Rugby Profile

1992 births
Living people
English rugby union players
England international rugby union players
Blaydon RFC players
Newcastle Falcons players
Rugby union props
Rugby union players from Newcastle upon Tyne
People educated at St. Cuthbert's School